Luca Marzano, known professionally as Aka 7even (born 23 October 2000) is an Italian singer, rapper and songwriter.

In 2020, he took part at the 20th edition of the Italian talent show Amici di Maria De Filippi, where he ended up second in the "Singers" section behind to Sangiovanni and fourth overall. He released his first studio album Aka 7even in May 2021, which peaked at number three of FIMI's album chart and was certified platinum in Italy. On 14 November 2021, he won the MTV Europe Music Award for Best Italian Act at the 2021 MTV Europe Music Awards in Budapest, Hungary.

He competed at the Sanremo Music Festival 2022 with the song "Perfetta così".

Discography

Studio albums

EPs

Singles

Awards and nominations

References

Italian singers
Living people
21st-century Italian male singers
2000 births